The black-billed coucal or lesser black coucal (Centropus bernsteini) is a species of cuckoo in the family Cuculidae. It is found in New Guinea.

References

black-billed coucal
Birds of New Guinea
black-billed coucal
Taxonomy articles created by Polbot